Korat City Football Club (Thai สโมสรฟุตบอลโคราช ซิตี้), is a Thai football club based in Nakhon Ratchasima, Thailand. The club is currently playing in the Thai Football Division 3.

Record

References

External links
 

Association football clubs established in 2015
Football clubs in Thailand
Nakhon Ratchasima province
2015 establishments in Thailand